Macheke is a small Zimbabwean town located in Murewa District, province of Mashonaland East, located about 105 km south-east of Harare on the main A3 Harare-Mutare  highway road. According to the 1982 population census, the town had a population of 1,888. It was named after the Macheke River and means "you have divided".
Macheke is the hometown of Vernon Chidongo a politician who played a pivotal role in the Lacoste succession. Chidongo was nearly appointed as the deputy minister of foreign affairs for Zimbabwe at the age of 22, but Emmerson Mnangagwa decided against it after strong opposition from certain members of the Zimbabwe government.
Macheke is also the hometown of Wicknell Chivayo, a well known and controversial Zimbabwean businessman accused of government contract abuse during the rule of Robert Mugabe.

Geography 
The city has old locations called Nyazema (high density suburbs), which were the first locations to be settled by the Macheke Founders. Now the town has grown into Springfield and Damview (low density suburbs), and Mutamba phase 1 & phase 2 (high density suburbs).

Demographics

Macheke residents are mostly from Malawi and other parts of Zimbabwe. The town founders are from Malawi and neighboring areas. English, Chishona, and Chichewa are the major languages spoken in Macheke.

Economy 
Tobacco and mixed crops are farmed in the surrounding lands. There are a number of large scale tobacco and horticultural farmers in the area so Macheke serves as the main business centre providing goods and services for the farming community.  
Regarding business expansion, Macheke has burgeoned.

Vending along the highway is one of the major economic activities done in this area. Hawkers mainly sell fresh farm produce that is sourced and procured from the surrounding farms. Main products sold include Tomatoes, potatoes and numerous other vegetables.

There are also a handful of horticultural exporters in the area. Crops grown for export mainly include soft fruit, mange tout peas and fine beans.

Personalities
Macheke is also the hometown of Vernon Chidongo, a prominent Zim-Hip Hop Artist and publicly proclaimed ally of the Zanu PF lacoste faction.

References

http://www.machekeproject.org/
Populated places in Mashonaland East Province